John Alexander Tilemann (born 25 March 1974) is the director of research for the Asia-Pacific Leadership Network on Nuclear Non-Proliferation and Disarmament. He is a former chief of staff to the International Atomic Energy Agency directors-general Hans Blix and Mohamed ElBaradei.

Tilemann is a retired Australian diplomat and senior career officer with the Department of Foreign Affairs and Trade (DFAT). His career postings included positions in Sri Lanka, Thailand, Pakistan, Poland, to the IAEA (1987-1990), and to the Middle East. He has also had policy roles in Canberra over last 20 years related to the Non-Proliferation Treaty and arms control. He was Australia's Ambassador to Jordan from 2001 until 2005.

Biography
Tilemann was born in New South Wales and attended Newington College (1959–1963) and the University of Sydney.  He later studied Buddhist issus at Vidyalankara University in Sri Lanka.

References

Living people
People educated at Newington College
University of Sydney alumni
Australian diplomats
1947 births